The Somali First Division, Somali League, or Somali Premier League, is the Somali professional league for men's association football. It has been active for over 50 years, having been established in 1967. 
Somalia has 10 professional clubs playing for the Somali First Division. Football is the most popular sport in Somalia. In the 1930s, Italian Colonial Authorities established some of the first teams in Somalia. In the 2021-22 season, Horseed won the Somali First Division.

Clubs
As of the upcoming 2022-2023 season:

Foreign players
Each team competing in the league is only allowed to register four foreign players at a time.

Previous winners
Previous winners were: 

1967: Somali National Police
1968: Hoga
1969: Lavori Publici
1970: Lavori Publici
1971: Lavori Publici
1971–72: Horseed
1972–73: Horseed
1973–74: Horseed
1975: Mogadishu Municipality 
1976–77: Horseed
1977–78: Horseed
1978–79: Horseed
1979–80: Horseed
1980–81: Lavori Publici
1982: Wagad (newly promoted)
1983: Printing Agency
1984: Marine Club
1985: Wagad
1986: Mogadishu Municipality
1987: Wagad
1988: Wagad
1989: Mogadishu Municipality
1990: Gaadiidka
1991–93: Not held
1994: Merca New Supplies
1995: Alba
1996–97: Not held
1998: Ports Authority
1999: Banadir
2000: Elman
2001: Elman
2002: Elman
2003: Elman
2004–06: Banadir
2007: Ports Authority
2008: Not held
2008–09: Banadir
2009–10: Banadir
2011: Elman
2012: Elman
2013–14: Banadir
2014–15: Heegan
2015–16: Banadir
2016–17: Dekedaha
2018: Dekedaha
2019: Dekedaha
2019–20: Mogadishu City Club
2020–21: Horseed

Performance by club

See also
Somalia League 2013–2014

References

External links
Somalia Football Association
League at FIFA.com 
League at Soccerway.com

Somali First Division
Football leagues in Somalia
Somalia